Brown Mountain, at an elevation of  , is the highest mountain in the Monaro region of New South Wales, Australia.

Location and features
Brown Mountain is located in the Kybeyan Range that is part of the Great Dividing Range.

See also

 Bombala River
 Brown Mountain Power Station
 Cochrane Dam
 List of mountains of New South Wales

References

Mountains of New South Wales
Snowy Monaro Regional Council